The Great Game is a 1930 British film, one of the earliest feature films to use football as a central theme.

The film's plot contains many elements of what would become clichés in the sporting film genre. Dicky Brown is a young, aspiring footballer who plays for a struggling side, the fictional  Manningford F.C., a team in the midst of a successful cup run. He manages to charm the daughter of the chairman and thus breaks into the side, and ultimately wins the Cup for his team.

The film covers now clichéd conflicts within football which still exist. The manager of the team wants to give his young players a chance in the side; the chairman, on the other hand, insists on signing established star players, such as Jack Cock (then of Millwall F.C., previously of Chelsea F.C. and Everton F.C.).

Much of the film is set in Chelsea's home ground, Stamford Bridge, and it contains guest appearances by numerous real-life footballers, including George Mills, Andy Wilson, Sam Millington and Billy Blyth. It was also notable for featuring the first credited appearance of Rex Harrison.

Cast
John Batten as Dicky Brown
Renee Clama as Peggy Jackson
Jack Cock as Jim Blake
Randle Ayrton as Henderson
Neil Kenyon as Jackson
Kenneth Kove as Bultitude
A. G. Poulton as Banks
Billy Blyth as Billy
Lew Lake as Tubby
Wally Patch as Joe Miller
Rex Harrison as George

External links
 

1930 films
1930s sports films
British association football films
Chelsea F.C.
British black-and-white films
1930s English-language films
Films directed by Jack Raymond
Films set in England
1930s British films